Yvonne Rozille, née Marie-Yvonne Gilberte Rouzille (5 January 1900, Commentry – 1 December 1985, Grasse) was a French film actress.

In 1937, she married Georges Gaillard, honorary prefect and codirector of the Théâtre du Vaudeville, founder of the Revue de Hollande.

Filmography 
1931: Ma tante d'Honfleur by André Gillois
1931: Mariage d'amour by Henri Diamant-Berger (short film)
1932: Moonlight by Henri Diamant-Berger : Berthe Lydiane
1935: La Route heureuse by Georges Lacombe : Tante Anna
1935: L'École des vierges by Pierre Weill
1935: Le Train d'amour by Pierre Weill
1935: La Coqueluche de ces dames by Gabriel Rosca
1936: Tout va très bien madame la marquise by Henry Wulschleger
1936: La Madone de l'Atlantique by Pierre Weill
1937: Un soir à Marseille by Maurice de Canonge
1937: Arsène Lupin détective by Henri Diamant-Berger
1937: La Fessée by Pierre Caron : Princesse Henriette
1938: L'Avion de minuit by Dimitri Kirsanoff
1939: Le Moulin dans le soleil by Marc Didier
1939: Face au destin by Henri Fescourt
1939: Louise by Abel Gance : Une cliente
1939: L'Esprit de Sidi-Brahim by Marc Didier
1945: Mensonges by Jean Stelli : Madame Dumontel
1949: Manèges by Yves Allégret
1963: Let's Rob the Bank by Jean Girault

References

Bibliography 
 Jean Méry, « Yvonne Rozille », Cinémonde, n° 374, 19 December 1935,

External links 
 

French film actresses
1900 births
People from Allier
1985 deaths
20th-century French women